Johan Nijenhuis (born 4 March 1968) is a Dutch film producer, director and screenwriter.

Career 

His 2019 film Cuban Love (Verliefd op Cuba in Dutch) was his sixth film to win the Platinum Film award. Most of the film was filmed on Cuba with some scenes filmed on Ibiza.

In 2020, his film The Marriage Escape (De beentjes van Sint-Hildegard in Dutch), an adaptation of the 2016 Czech film Tiger Theory, received a nomination for the Golden Calf for Best Feature Film award. It was also the highest-grossing Dutch film of 2020. His film Men at Work: Miami (Onze Jongens in Miami in Dutch) was the second highest-grossing film of that year.

Awards

Golden Film and Platinum Film 

 2001: Costa!
 2003: Full Moon Party
 2013: Verliefd op Ibiza
 2014: Tuscan Wedding
 2016: Rokjesdag
 2019: Cuban Love
 2020: The Marriage Escape

Golden Film 

 2020: Men at Work: Miami
 2022: Yasmine's Wedding (Marokkaanse bruiloft)
 2022: Zwanger & Co

References

External links 
 

1968 births
Living people
Dutch film directors
Dutch film producers
Dutch male screenwriters
21st-century Dutch people